The Outcasts is an American Western genre television series, appearing on ABC in the 1968-69 season. The series stars Don Murray and Otis Young. It is most notable for being the first television Western with an African American co-star.

Synopsis
"Jemal David and Earl Corey.  One black, one white;  one ex-Union soldier, one ex-Confederate officer;  one ex-slave, one ex-slave owner. Together, they are the Outcasts."

Those words opened a series telling the story of bounty hunter Jemal David (Young) and ex-Confederate cavalry officer Earl Corey (Murray) who teams up with David in the early 1870s.

Several dynamics ran through the show.  For one, the two heroes were not friends - Corey would frequently to call David "Boy" and David would call him "Boss".  They were reluctant partners, both very fast and deadly with a gun, who were thrown together by circumstance when Corey walked into town carrying his saddle and needing a job, and David badly needing another gun to watch his back.  Each had something the other wanted.  And David was a realist, knowing there were places Corey could enter that he, a black man, could not.  There were times when Corey had to ponder whether to side with other whites or back up his new partner.  And David had to learn to trust a man who, a few years before, had held the whip hand - literally - and who once considered slaves to be "inventory".  But, as they moved through their new situation, a grudging respect came into being.  It was not real friendship.  "We ride together" Corey said, when asked.  But there were hints along the way.

A rich - poor dichotomy was very subtle.  Earl Corey had lived on a Virginia plantation, a rich man, who returned after the war to find his plantation untouched, everything just as he left it - but now in the hands of his pro-Union brother whom Corey, and other Southerners, considered a traitor.  With the Union army and the carpetbaggers now in charge, Corey found himself with nothing.  Jemal David, on the other hand, had been a slave who had never owned anything.  Even his name was manufactured from a bottle of hair tonic.  But he was now fairly prosperous, at least by his own standards.  Earl tended to be tense in this "new" environment, but Jemal took things in stride, having come up, as he said: "a tough road... a long, hard road..." Both men lived only for the day.

Episodes

Film
In 1973, several episodes of the series were compiled together as an overseas theatrical release entitled Call Me By My Rightful Name.

Syndication
The Outcasts aired on the classic TV network GetTV on Sunday mornings between 2016 and 2020. In October 2021, GetTV began airing The Outcasts on Saturday and Sunday mornings.

Reception
The show was criticized for "excessive violence", and was canceled after 26 episodes.

Harlan Ellison deplored the show in his review for the Los Angeles Free Press. The inclusion of a black character, he said, was supposed to illustrate that black people were "normal, functioning members of the society", but the writers and producers were so out of touch that they were incapable of portraying black people as they really are. Citing an episode where Corey seduces an innkeeper's wife while David watches, he conceded that it was realistic to show black/white romance as unthinkable for the time, but that showing David as having normal desires wouldn't have been too much to ask: instead, "the black man is allowed to vent his frustration and loneliness and hostility only through the use of the gun. We know what jingo propaganda that parallels."

Awards and nominations

References

External links

 

1968 American television series debuts
1969 American television series endings
American Broadcasting Company original programming
1960s American drama television series
English-language television shows
Period television series
1960s Western (genre) television series
Television series by Screen Gems
Television series set in the 1860s